Giancarlo Schiaffini is an Italian jazz trombonist and tubist most associated with avant-garde music, free improvisation and free jazz. A member of the Italian Instabile Orchestra, Schiaffini has worked with such artists as Mario Schiano, Lol Coxhill, Andrea Centazzo and also Thurston Moore of Sonic Youth.
Also, he has collaborated with the Gruppo di Improvvisazione di Nuova Consonanza.

Discography

As leader
 w/ Gianluigi Trovesi, Daniele Cavallanti, Eugenio Colombo, Pasquale Innarella, Rudy Migliardi, Tiziano Tononi 
 w/ Sandro Satta & Alberto Mandarini

 w/ Mario Schiano & Bruno Tommaso
 w/ Silvia Schiavoni
 w/ Giovanni Maier & Michele Rabbia

As sideman

References

20th-century trombonists
21st-century trombonists
20th-century tubists
21st-century tubists
Free jazz trombonists
Free jazz tubists
Musicians from Rome
Living people
Avant-garde jazz trombonists
Avant-garde jazz tubists
Italian Instabile Orchestra members
Year of birth missing (living people)